Sayyid Mahmoud Nabavian is an Iranian Shia cleric and conservative politician who formerly was a member of the Parliament of Iran representing Tehran, Rey, Shemiranat and Eslamshahr.

See also 
 Morteza Aghatehrani
 Mohsen Pirhadi

References

1965 births
Living people
Members of the 9th Islamic Consultative Assembly
Deputies of Tehran, Rey, Shemiranat and Eslamshahr
Front of Islamic Revolution Stability politicians